The Administración Federal de Ingresos Públicos, usually shortened as AFIP is the revenue service of Argentina. It administers taxation in Argentina. The AFIP made a deal with the American IRS to share information in 2017.

The AFIP is an agency under the Ministry of Economy.

References

External links
 Official site 

Finance in Argentina